Methyl hypochlorite is the simplest of the organic alkyl hypochlorites. It is an unstable compound that can be produced by the reaction of methanol with hypochlorous acid. It was first synthesized by Sandmeyer in the 1880s.

Methyl hypochlorite forms in the Earth's atmosphere by a reaction between ClO and CH3OO and is thought to be an important species in ozone destruction over the Arctic and Antarctic regions.

See also
 tert-Butyl hypochlorite, a useful and relatively stable organic hypochlorite

References

Hypochlorite esters
Methyl esters
Organic compounds with 1 carbon atom